New Hampshire Route 151 (abbreviated NH 151) is a  north–south highway in Rockingham County in southeastern New Hampshire. The road runs between North Hampton and Greenland. NH 151 is locally named Post Road. For most of its length, NH 151 parallels Interstate 95, but there are no interchanges with I-95.

The southern terminus of NH 151 is at U.S. Route 1 (Lafayette Road) in North Hampton. The northern terminus is at New Hampshire Route 33 near the Pease International Tradeport in Greenland.

Major intersections

References

External links

 New Hampshire State Route 151 on Flickr

151
Transportation in Rockingham County, New Hampshire